The Dreikönigsgymnasium ("Tricoronatum", meaning "Three Kings School", sometimes called in English the College of the Three Crowns) is a regular public Gymnasium located in Cologne, Germany. Founded in 1450 by the city of Cologne, it is the oldest school in Cologne and one of the oldest in Germany. In 1556 it was transferred to Jesuit control through the son of the mayor, who had become a Jesuit. The Jesuits continued to run the school until 1778, when control was restored to the city after the papal suppression of the Jesuits of 1773.

Alumni
 Julius Echter von Mespelbrunn (1545–1617) was a Prince-Bishop of Würzburg
 Dietrich von Fürstenberg (1546–1618), Prince-Bishop of the Roman Catholic Diocese of Paderborn
 Johann Adam Schall von Bell (1592–1666), Jesuit missionary to China
 Maximilian Henry of Bavaria (1621-1688), Archbishop-Elector of Cologne
 Franz Egon of Fürstenberg (1626–1682), Imperial Count
 Wilhelm Egon von Fürstenberg (1629–1704), prince of Fürstenberg-Heiligenberg
 Theodor Schwann (1810–1882), physiologist
 Adolph Kolping (1813–1865), Catholic priest
 Carl Schurz (1829–1906), German revolutionary, American statesman and reformer, and Union Army general
 Wilhelm Marx (1863–1946), Chancellor of Germany during the Weimar Republic
 Fritz Schramma (born 1947), Mayor of Cologne
 Peter Kohlgraf (born 1967), Bishop of Mainz
 Daniel Brühl (born 1978), Actor

Famous teachers
 Francis Coster (1532–1619), Jesuit theologian
 Georg Ohm (1789–1854), Physicist
 Justus Velsius
 Friedrich von Spee (1591–1635), Jesuit, poet and opponent of Witch trials
 Peter Wust (1884–1940), Philosopher

References

External links 
Homepage of the Dreikönigsgymnasium Köln (in German)

Gymnasiums in Germany
Schools in Cologne
Educational institutions established in the 15th century
1450s establishments in the Holy Roman Empire
1450 establishments in Europe
Nippes, Cologne